José Gregorio Briceño Torrealba (born July 25, 1965, in Caicara) is a Venezuelan politician.

Life 
Briceño began his political life in 1979 as a member of Acción Democrática (AD). After being expelled from AD in 1991 Briceño founded a political party called Movimiento Independiente Cedeño (MIC). He became mayor of Cedeño Municipality in the regional elections of 1992 and was re-elected in 1995. In 1997 he founded a new political party named MIGATO. This became part of PSUV in 2007.

Briceño ran unsuccessfully for the governor of Monagas' office in 1998; however he won a seat in the Venezuelan Chamber of Deputies as Deputy. In 1999 Briceño was a member of the Constituent Assembly. In 2000 Briceño lost the competition for the governor's office again, although he was elected deputy of the National Assembly of Venezuela.

José Gregorio Briceño became governor of Monagas in 2004 and was re-elected in the elections of 2008.

Sources 
   Official Biography

1965 births
Living people
Governors of Monagas
Members of the Venezuelan Chamber of Deputies
Members of the National Assembly (Venezuela)
Democratic Action (Venezuela) politicians
MIGATO politicians
United Socialist Party of Venezuela politicians
Mayors of places in Venezuela
People from Monagas
Members of the Venezuelan Constituent Assembly of 1999